If You Can Beat Me Rockin'... is the second studio album by American blues musician Gary B. B. Coleman. The album was released in 1988 by Ichiban Records label.

Reception
Niles J. Frantz of AllMusic gave the album four and half stars out of five, stating "He was influenced by Jimmy Reed, T-Bone Walker, B.B. King, and Lightnin' Hopkins, along with country & western, cajun, and early rock & roll." In his review for The Virgin Encyclopedia of the Blues Gérard Herzhaft commented "The best album yet from this strange southern bluesman. Sometimes luckluster but sometimes also very tasty."

Track listing

Personnel
Gary B.B. Coleman – producer, lead guitar, bass, rhythm guitar, harmonica 
Harold Banks – backing vocals, drums
Mike McDaniels – backing vocals
Sheryl Martin – backing vocals
Henry Whitting – bass (track 2)
Mike Alexander – bass
Bryan Rochon – drums 
Bobby Jones – keyboards
Frank Amato – keyboards (bass)
Mike McDaniels – rhythm guitar
Rick Morris  – rhythm guitar (track 2)

References

1988 albums
Gary B. B. Coleman albums
Ichiban Records albums